Babaheydar District is in Farsan County, Chaharmahal and Bakhtiari province, Iran. At the 2006 census, its constituent villages were in the Central District. The following census in 2011 counted 8,770 people in 2,343 households, by which time the district had been established with two rural districts and the city of Babaheydar as its center. At the latest census in 2016, the district had 18,917 inhabitants living in 5,478 households.

References 

Farsan County

Districts of Chaharmahal and Bakhtiari Province

Populated places in Chaharmahal and Bakhtiari Province

Populated places in Farsan County

fa:بخش باباحیدر